Jimi Hendrix (1942–1970) was an American musician whose career spanned the years between 1962 and 1970. His posthumous discography includes recordings released after September 18, 1970. Hendrix left behind many recordings in varying stages of completion. This material, along with reissues of his career catalogue, has been released over the years in several formats by various producers and record companies. Since Experience Hendrix, a company owned and operated by members of the Hendrix family, took control of his recording legacy in 1995, over 15 Hendrix albums have appeared on the main US albums chart. Several of these have also placed on charts in more than 18 countries around the world.

At the time of his death, Hendrix was recording songs for a fourth studio album. He was working on enough material for a double album and had sketched out possible track lists. However, only about six songs were nearing completion, with an additional twenty or so in different stages of development. The first attempt at presenting Hendrix's fourth studio album, a single LP record titled The Cry of Love, was released in 1971 and reached number three on Billboard's album chart. A second attempt titled Voodoo Soup, with some different songs and a new audio mix, was released in 1995 and appeared at number 66. In 1997, Experience Hendrix restored the original mixes and added several songs for a third release: the double-album length First Rays of the New Rising Sun, the first to use one of Hendrix's proposed titles, reached number 49.

In addition to songs planned for a fourth studio album, numerous demos, studio outtakes/alternate takes, and jams have been released. Albums of concert performances and compilations focusing on various aspects of Hendrix's work have been issued. From 1970 to 1992, his record companies Reprise Records in the US and Track Records/Polydor Records in the UK continued to handle his recordings. MCA Records took over in 1992, during the controversial tenure of subsequent producer Alan Douglas. Since 2010, Sony/Legacy Recordings has been distributing the releases produced by Experience Hendrix. Besides legitimate releases, many bootleg and grey market albums have appeared over the years. Many of these have been reissued several times with different album titles, packaging, and song titles. Some purporting to feature Hendrix as a sideman have been shown to be fake. To meet the demand, Dagger Records was established in 1998 to issue "official bootlegs" of albums "that don't meet the technical recording criteria" and standards for mainstream release. These have included live recordings from various points in his career as well as demo and rehearsal recordings.

Studio recordings

Live albums

Soundtracks

Anthologies and retrospective albums

Singles

Extended plays and special releases
{| class="wikitable plainrowheaders"
|-
! width="30"|Year
! width="300"|Details
! width="200"|Track listing
|-
| 1974
!scope="row"| ''...And a Happy New YearReleased: December 1974 (US)
Label: Reprise (PRO 595)
Format: 7-inch single
Notes: Promotional, re-released in 1979 as a 12-inch single (Reprise PRO-A 840); released commercially in 1999 as Merry Christmas and Happy New Year
|
"The Little Drummer Boy" / "Silent Night" / "Auld Lang Syne"
"Three Little Bears"
"The Little Drummer Boy" / "Silent Night" / "Auld Lang Syne" (extended version)
|-
| 1978
!scope="row"| Gloria
Released: July 1978 (UK), July 1979 (US)
Label: Polydor (UK) (2612 034), Reprise (US) (EP 2293)
Format: 7-inch maxi single
Notes: Bonus disc with The Essential Jimi Hendrix (UK) & The Essential Jimi Hendrix Volume Two (US)
|
"Gloria"
|-
| 1980
!scope="row"| 6 Singles Pack
Released: 1980 (UK)
Label: Polydor (260 8001)
Format: 7-inch singles
Notes: Limited edition box set of first 5 UK singles, plus "Voodoo Chile" / "Gloria"
|
"Hey Joe" / "Stone Free"
"Purple Haze" / "51st Anniversary"
"The Wind Cries Mary" / "Highway Chile"
"Burning of the Midnight Lamp" / "The Stars That Play with Laughing Sam's Dice"
"All Along the Watchtower" / "Long Hot Summer Night"
"Voodoo Chile" / "Gloria"
|-
| rowspan="2"|1982
!scope="row"| All Along the Watchtower
Released: 1982 (UK)
Labels: Polydor (POSPX401)
Format: 12-inch
|
"All Along the Watchtower"
"Foxy Lady"
"Purple Haze"
"Manic Depression"
|-
!scope="row"| Voodoo Chile
Released: 1982 (UK)
Labels: Polydor (POSPX608)
Format: 12-inch
|
"Voodoo Chile (Slight Return)"
"Gypsy Eyes"
"Hey Joe"
"3rd Stone from the Sun"
|-
| rowspan="2"| 1988
!scope="row"| Day Tripper
Released: 1988
Label: Rykodisc (RCD31-008)
Formats: CD
Notes: Promo sampler for Radio One, included on BBC Sessions
|
"Day Tripper"
"Drivin' South"
"Hear My Train A Comin'"
|-
!scope="row"| The Peel Sessions
Released: 1988 (UK)
Label: Strange Fruit (SFPSCD065)
Format: CD
Notes: 5 tracks from Top Gear radio program with John Peel, included on BBC sessions
|
"Radio One Theme"
"Day Tripper"
"Wait Until Tomorrow"
"Hear My Train A Comin'"
"Spanish Castle Magic"
|-
| rowspan="2"|1989
!scope="row"| Radio Radio
Released: 1989
Label: Rykodisc (PRO-00785)
Format: CD
Notes: Promo sampler for Radio One, included on BBC sessions
|
"Day Tripper"
"Hoochie Koochie Man"
"Hound Dog"
"Hear My Train A Comin'"
"Stone Free"
|-
!scope="row"| Purple Haze
Released: February 6, 1989 (UK)
Label: Polydor (P 33)
Format: 7-inch, 12-inch, CD
Notes: Promo sampler for The Singles Album re-release; additional tracks appear on different formats
|
"Purple Haze"
"51st Anniversary"
|-
| 1990
!scope="row"| Between the Lines
Released: 1990 (US)
Labels: Reprise (PRO-CD 4541)
Format: CD single
Notes: Promo sampler for Lifelines: The Jimi Hendrix Story
|
Jimi Hendrix Narration
"Hey Joe"
"I'm a Man"
Pete Townshend and Eric Clapton Narration / "Red House"
Jimi Hendrix Narration / "Drivin' South"
"The Things That I Used to Do"
"1983... (A Merman I Should Turn to Be)"
"Purple Haze"
"Rainy Day Shuffle"
"Angel"
|-
| rowspan="2"|1991
!scope="row"| Stages '67'70 Sampler
Released: 1990
Labels: Reprise (PRO-CD 5194)
Format: CD
Notes: Promo sampler for Stages
|
"Hey Joe"
"Burning of the Midnight Lamp"
"Purple Haze"
"The Wind Cries Mary"
"Red House"
"Voodoo Child (Slight Return)"
"Spanish Castle Magic
"Hear My Train A Comin'"
|-
!scope="row"| Jimi Plays Berkeley
Released: 1991
Labels: BMG (791 168)
Format: CD
Notes: CD included with Jimi Plays Berkeley video
|
"Freedom"
"Red House"
"Ezy Ryder"
|-
|rowspan="2"|1992
!scope="row"|Live at Winterland + 3
Released: 1992 (US)
Labels: Rykodisc (RCD2038/+3)
Format: CD
Notes: Issued with 1992 Live at Winterland box set, included on Winterland
|
"Are You Experienced?"
"Voodoo Chile"
"Like a Rolling Stone"
|-
!scope="row"| The Wind Cries Mary
Released: 1992 (UK)
Labels: Polydor (863917-1)
Format: 12-inch
Notes: 3 tracks from The Ultimate Experience
|
"The Wind Cries Mary"
"Fire"
"Foxy Lady"
"May This Be Love"
|-
| 1995
!scope="row"| Stepping Stone
Released: 1995 (US)
Labels: MCA (MCA5P-3357)
Format: CD single
Notes: Promo sampler for Voodoo Soup, included on First Rays of the New Rising Sun
|
"Stepping Stone"
|-
| 1997
!scope="row"| Jimi Hendrix
Released: 1997 (US)
Labels: MCA (MCA5P-4079)
Format: CD
Notes: Promo sampler with Fender; tracks from South Saturn Delta, First Rays of the New Rising Sun, and Are You Experienced 
|
"Power of Soul"
"Freedom"
"Foxy Lady"
|-
| 1998
!scope="row"| BBC Sessions
Released: 1998
Labels: MCA (MCA5P-4167)
Format: CD
Notes: Promo sampler for BBC Sessions
|
"Foxy Lady"
"Hey Joe"
"Love or Confusion"
"Little Miss Lover"
"Can You Please Crawl Out Your Window?"
"(I'm Your) Hoochie Coochie Man"
"Day Tripper"
"Voodoo Child (Slight Return)"
|-
| rowspan="5"|1999
!scope="row"| Get DMXperienced
Released: 1999 (US)
Labels: Universal (31 4564998-2)
Format: CD
Notes: Promo sampler with Reebok
|
"Are You Experienced?"
"Fire"
"The Star-Spangled Banner"
|-
!scope="row"| Live at the Fillmore East
Released: 1999
Labels: MCA (MCA5P-4319)
Format: CD
Notes: Promo sampler for Live at the Fillmore East
|
"Stepping Stone"
"Machine Gun"
"Changes"
"Who Knows"
|-
!scope="row"| Machine Gun
Released: 1999 (US)
Labels: MCA (MCA5P-4320)
Format: CD
Notes: Promo sampler with Sam Goody and Guitar World
|
"Machine Gun"
|-
!scope="row"| Live at Woodstock
Released: 1999
Labels: MCA (MCA5P-4372)
Format: 7-inch, CD
Notes: Promo sampler for Live at Woodstock, CD has extra track "Spanish Castle Magic"
|
"The Star-Spangled Banner"
"Purple Haze"
|-
!scope="row"| Merry Christmas and Happy New Year
Released: 1999
Labels: MCA (088 155 651)
Format: CD, 10-inch
Notes: Commercial release of 1974 ...And a Happy New Year, reached No. 10 in 1999 & #16 in 2000 in Canada; re-released 2010 with two tracks & alternative cover (Legacy 88697-77228-1), reached No. 4 in 2010 on Billboard Overall Singles chart
|
"The Little Drummer Boy" / "Silent Night" / "Auld Lang Syne"
"Three Little Bears"
"The Little Drummer Boy" / "Silent Night" / "Auld Lang Syne" (extended version)
|-
| rowspan="2"|2000
!scope="row"| The Jimi Hendrix Experience
Released: 2000 (UK)
Labels: MCA (JHPRO1)
Format: CD
Notes: 4-song promo sampler for The Jimi Hendrix Experience box set
|
"Purple Haze"
"Little Miss Lover"
"Spanish Castle Magic"
"Lover Man"
|-
!scope="row"| The Jimi Hendrix Experience
Released: 2000 (US)
Labels: MCA (JHPRO2)
Format: CD
Notes: 8-song promo sampler for The Jimi Hendrix Experience box set
|
"Purple Haze"
"Little Wing"
"Sgt. Peppers Lonely Hearts Club"
"Stone Free"
"Gloria"
"It's Too Bad"
"Lover Man"
"All Along the Watchtower"
|-
| 2002
!scope="row"| Voodoo Child: The Jimi Hendrix Collection
Released: 2002
Labels: MCA (JH01)
Format: CD
Notes: Promo sampler for Voodoo Child: The Jimi Hendrix Collection
|
"Purple Haze"
"Hey Joe"
"Crosstown Traffic"
"Third Stone from the Sun"
|-
| 2006
!scope="row"| Jimi Hendrix: 10 Tracks Performed Live at the Royal Albert Hall
Released: September 26, 2006 (UK)
Labels:  The Sunday Times
Format: CD
Notes: Free CD distributed with the newspaper
| 
"Little Wing"
"Voodoo Chile"
"Room Full of Mirrors"
"Fire"
"Purple Haze"
"Wild Thing"
"Bleeding Heart"
"Sunshine of Your Love"
"Hey Joe"
"Foxy Lady"
|-
| 2011
!scope="row"| San Francisco 1968
Released: 2011
Labels: Dagger (8869 794682 2)
Format: CD
Notes: Bonus disc with some Winterland releases, included on Paris 1967/San Francisco 1968
|
"Killing Floor"
"Red House"
"Catfish Blues"
"Dear Mr. Fantasy (Part One)"
"Dear Mr. Fantasy (Part Two)"
|-
|}

Official bootlegs
Dagger Records releases
Dagger Records was established in 1998 by Experience Hendrix to issue "official bootlegs" of albums  "that don't meet the technical recording criteria" and standards for mainstream release.

Experience Hendrix website
Several amateur recordings of Hendrix concerts are free to stream from the Experience Hendrix website. As of September 11, 2020, the following are available:

Hendrix as an accompanist
Albums as sideman

Singles as sideman

See also
Jimi Hendrix videography
List of songs recorded by Jimi Hendrix

NotesFootnotesCitationsReferences'''

Discography
Rock music discographies
Discographies of American artists
Albums published posthumously
Songs released posthumously